The Appellate Division, Supreme Court of Bangladesh is the appellate court in Bangladesh.  The Appellate Division is the final court of appeal for all civil and criminal cases, with appellate review authority over judgements of the High Court Division.

The Court is composed of eight judges, led by its Chief Justice, Hasan Foez Siddique.

History
The Appellate Division is Bangladesh's highest court, and thus its court of final appeal. Its earliest predecessor was the Supreme Court of Pakistan which, following partition of India introduced in 1947, had the distinctionary powers of being the highest Courts for all cases.

Jurisdiction

Appellate Jurisdiction
As the final court of appeal of the country, it takes up appeals primarily against verdicts of the High Court Division and other courts and tribunals.

Issue and execution of appellate processes

Power of Review

Advisory Jurisdiction

Rule making power

Justices of the Appellate Division

References

Judiciary of Bangladesh
Law of Bangladesh